Friedrich Kettler (Latvian: Frīdrihs Ketlers, 25 November 1569 in Mitau (now Jelgava) – 17 August 1642) was Duke of Courland and Semigallia (Latvian: Kurzemes un Zemgales hercogiste, now part of Latvia) from 1587 to 1642.

He was the son of Gotthard Kettler, the first Duke of Courland. Until 1617, he ruled only the eastern Zemgale (Semigallia) portion of the duchy, while his younger brother, Wilhelm Kettler, ruled the western Courland portion. Friedrich ruled the entire duchy from 1617 onward, after his brother emigrated due to conflicts with the nobility.

Life and reign 
Friedrich Kettler was born to Gotthard Kettler and his wife, Anna of Mecklenburg. The first of two sons, Friedrich in his youth had a good education and travelled to many other European countries. According to Gotthard Kettler's will, the duchy was to be divided between his two sons.

After his father's death in 1587, Friedrich and his younger brother, Wilhelm, became co-rulers of the duchy. After Wilhelm reached his majority in 1596, the duchy was officially partitioned into its Courland and Semigallian parts.

During the Polish–Swedish War, Friedrich and Wilhelm led their troops in battles against the Swedes, with Friedrich leading 300 big cavalry units in the Battle of Salaspils (1605). During the war, Courland's aristocracy grew in their resistance to the ruling Kettler brothers.

In 1617, the Regional Assembly of Courland (Landtag) sat in Schrunden Castle and decided that Wilhelm be stripped of his title and banished from the duchy. The following year, Friedrich was elected as the sole Duke of Courland, and he approved a new constitution, Formula Regiminis, which gave greater rights to the aristocracy. Among the new parameters set by this constitution were that the duke could not implement decisions without the prior consent of the duchy's council, thus making Courland a constitutional monarchy.

In 1622, the duke's residence in Mitau was surrounded by the Swedish army, forcing Friedrich to move to Goldingen (now Kuldiga).

Marriage 
Friedrich Kettler married Elisabeth Magdalena of Pomerania in 1600. They did not have issue, so in 1625, he proposed that Wilhelm's son, Jacob, be recognised as heir. The duchy's council agreed to this proposal, and Jacob was made co-ruler in 1638.

Sources 
 

1569 births
1642 deaths
16th-century Latvian people
17th-century Latvian people
Dukes of Courland
Protestant monarchs
Burials in the Ducal Crypt of the Jelgava Palace